Zhu Zaiyu (1536 – 19 May 1611) was a Chinese mathematician, physicist, choreographer, and music theorist. He was a prince of the Chinese Ming dynasty. In 1584, Prince Zhu innovatively described the equal temperament via accurate mathematical calculation.

Biography
Zhu was born in Qinyang, Henan Province to an aristocratic family, the sixth-generation descendant of the Hongxi Emperor, the fourth emperor of the Ming Dynasty. Zhu inherited the title the Prince of Zheng in 1593, but quickly resigned it to his cousin. On the emperor's order, he was granted a new princely title in 1606, the year he delivered a set of ten musicological treatises to the court, establishing his scholarly merit. His posthumous name was 鄭端靖世子 ("His Excellency The Dauphin of Zheng").

Zhu wrote on music theory and temperament (five treatises survive), music history (two treatises survive), dance and dance music (five treatises survive), and several other works. Three music theory works in particular are associated with the ideas of equal temperament, the「律學新說」 (" on the equal temperament ", 1584), 「律呂精義」("A clear explanation of that which concerns the equal temperament", 1595/96), and 「算學新說」(" Reflection on mathematics", 1603). His work has been described as "the crowning achievement of two millennia of acoustical experiment and research (Robinson 1962:224)" and he is described as "one of the most important historians of his nation's music."

Zhu also wrote treatises (three survive) on astronomy, physics, mathematics and calendrics, calculated the magnetic declination of Peking, the mass density of mercury and accurately described the duration of one tropical year to correct the Ming calendar.

Zhu's work on equal temperament didn't get any official recognition during his lifetime nor during the Qing dynasty. This was due to the Ming and Qing emphasis on classical scholarship and discouragement of ideas based on empirical observation rather than textual interpretations.

See also

Book of Songs (Chinese)
Chinese mathematics
Chinese musicology
Equal temperament
Jing Fang
Shen Kuo
Shí-èr-lǜ
Zhang Heng

References

Further reading
Cho, Gene J. The discovery of musical equal temperament in China and Europe in the sixteenth century. Lewiston, N.Y. : Edwin Mellen Press, 2003.

1536 births
1611 deaths
16th-century Chinese artists
17th-century Chinese astronomers
Chinese choreographers
Chinese musical instrument makers
Heirs apparent who never acceded
Historians from Henan
Physicists from Henan
Ming dynasty musicians
Ming dynasty imperial princes
Musicians from Henan
Writers from Jiaozuo
Mathematicians from Henan
Artists from Henan
17th-century Chinese mathematicians
16th-century Chinese mathematicians
16th-century Chinese astronomers
16th-century Chinese musicians
17th-century Chinese musicians